White Lies (original title: ...Comme elle respire (La Menteuse est amoureuse)) is a French comedy film directed by Pierre Salvadori, released in 1998.

Synopsis
Is mythomania an evil trait, or a sickness? Jeanne, played by Marie Trintignant, can never tell the truth for more than two minutes. She fears that reality is too much for her. And Guillaume Depardieu, who plays the role of her lover, discovers her mythomania, but stays in love with her.

Cast
 Marie Trintignant as Jeanne
 Guillaume Depardieu as Antoine
 Jean-François Stévenin as Marcel
 Serge Riaboukine as Barnabé
 Blanchette Brunoy as Madeleine
 Michèle Moretti as Jeanne's mother
 Bernard Verley as Jeanne's father
 Marc Susini as François
 Blandine Pélissier as Hélène
 Gwenaëlle Simon as Isabelle
 Jacques Dacqmine as Lawyer Maillard

Accolades

References

External links

 
 
 Comme elle respire at AlloCiné 

1998 films
1998 comedy films
Films set in Corsica
Films directed by Pierre Salvadori
French comedy films
1990s French films